The IV Constitutional Government was the fourth Constitutional Government (administration or cabinet) under the Constitution of East Timor.  Formed on 8 August 2007, it was led by the country's fifth Prime Minister, Xanana Gusmão, and was replaced by the V Constitutional Government on 8 August 2012.

Composition
The government was made up of Ministers, Vice Ministers and Secretaries of State, as follows:

Ministers

Vice Ministers

Secretaries of State

References

Notes

Further reading

External links
Council of Ministers of the IV Constitutional Government – Government of East Timor
Five-Years Mandate: Positive Balance – Government of East Timor
Program of the IV Constitutional Government – Government of East Timor

Cabinets established in 2007
Cabinets disestablished in 2012
Constitutional Governments of East Timor
2007 establishments in East Timor
2012 disestablishments in East Timor